PACD  may refer to:

 Posterior amorphous corneal dystrophy
 Cold Bay Airport (ICAO location indicator: PACD), in Cold Bay, Alaska, United States